Bryotropha arabica is a moth of the family Gelechiidae. It is found in Spain, France, Bulgaria, North Macedonia and Greece, as well as on Crete, Cyprus and Sicily. Outside of Europe, it is found in Turkey, North Africa (Morocco, Algeria, Tunisia, Libya), the Middle East (Israel, Lebanon, Syria), Saudi Arabia, Yemen, Iraq, Iran and Turkmenistan.

The wingspan is 12–17 mm. The forewings are grey to ochreous brown, mottled with black. The extreme base has a light ochreous basal spot followed by black patches. The hindwings are pale grey, but are darker towards the apex. Adults have been recorded on wing from April to October in Europe and from January to October in south-west Asia. There is at least one reported case of a woman being infested with the larvae in her womb.

References

Moths described in 1952
arabica
Moths of Europe
Moths of Africa
Moths of Asia